Jennifer Walker (born 9 April 1956) is an Australian former professional tennis player. She was the 1974 Australian Open junior champion.

Walker's best results in grand slam tennis came in doubles, with a quarter-final appearance at the 1976 Wimbledon Championships with Chris O'Neil and a semi-final appearance at the 1979 Australian Open partnering Chris Newton.

References

External links
 
 

1956 births
Living people
Australian female tennis players
Australian Open (tennis) junior champions
Grand Slam (tennis) champions in girls' singles